The Ribbon Ridge AVA is an American Viticultural Area in Yamhill County, Oregon. It is the smallest AVA in Oregon and is entirely contained within the Chehalem Mountains AVA, which in turn is entirely contained within the larger Willamette Valley AVA. Ribbon Ridge stretches between the towns of Newberg and Gaston. The ridge is defined by local geographic boundaries and an uplift of ocean sediment. It lies at 45°  21' N latitude and 123° 04' W longitude, at the northwest end of the Chehalem Mountains. Colby Carter, an early settler from Missouri, named Ribbon Ridge in 1865, and the ridge has been known by that name ever since. The first official use of the Ribbon Ridge name dates to 1888 with the creation of Ribbon Ridge School District No. 68.

See also 
Eyrie Vineyards, originator of Oregon Pinot noir
List of Oregon wineries and vineyards

References

External links 
Ribbon Ridge AVA 

American Viticultural Areas
Oregon wine
Geography of Yamhill County, Oregon
2005 establishments in Oregon